Márk Papp (born 8 January 1994) is a Hungarian marathon swimmer. He placed 13th in the men's marathon 10 kilometre event at the 2016 Summer Olympics.

References

1994 births
Living people
Hungarian male swimmers
Olympic swimmers of Hungary
Swimmers at the 2016 Summer Olympics
Male long-distance swimmers
20th-century Hungarian people
21st-century Hungarian people